Richard Joseph Tobin is an American businessman. He was the Chief Executive Officer of CNH Industrial N.V.

Richard Tobin is currently the CEO of Dover Corporation

Career 

Richard Tobin holds a Bachelor of Arts degree from Norwich University (Northfield, Vermont) and received a Master of Business Administration from Drexel University (Philadelphia). Prior to beginning his business career, Tobin served as an Officer in the United States Army from 1985 to 1989.

He held the role of Chief Financial Officer and Head of Information Technology for SGS SA of Geneva, Switzerland. He also held roles in international marketing and management with the GTE Corporation of Stamford (Connecticut, United States), AluSuisse-Lonza SA of Zurich (Switzerland) and Alcan Aluminum of Montreal (Canada).

Prior to the merger of Fiat Industrial S.p.A. and CNH Global, he was the Chief Executive Officer of CNH Global and group Chief Operating Officer of Fiat Industrial S.p.A., roles he assumed after two years as Chief Financial Officer (CFO) for CNH Global.

Furthermore, Richard Tobin holds the position of Vice Chairman of Turk Traktor ve Ziraat Makineleri AS of Ankara (Turkey), and serves on the Board of Directors for the Dover Corporation of Downers Grove (Illinois). He currently sits on the U.S. Chamber of Commerce Board of Directors, and is a member of the Business Roundtable.

Richard Tobin has been mentioned by FCA Chairman, John Elkann, as one of the managers who could eventually replace Sergio Marchionne as FCA Chief Executive Officer after 2018.

See also 
 CNH Industrial
 Fiat Industrial
 CNH Global
 UNITED STATES CHAMBER OF COMMERCE

References

External links 
 Curriculum from CNH Industrial website
 CNH Industrial website
 U.S. Chamber of Commerce website
 Business Roundtable website
 Turk Traktor website
 Dover Corporation website

American businesspeople
Living people
Year of birth missing (living people)